James Harshaw Fraser (1841 – July 28, 1899) was a Canadian lawyer and political figure in Ontario. He represented London in the House of Commons of Canada from 1875 to 1878 as a Liberal-Conservative member.

He was born in Westminster, Canada West, the son of a Major Fraser, and was educated in London. He studied law with William Elliott, who later became a judge, and was called to the bar in 1867. Fraser married Sophia Robinson Elliott. He practised law in London, Ontario. He was first elected in an 1875 by-election held after John Walker was unseated. Fraser died in Gravenhurst at the age of 58.

His son William Elliot Fraser died while serving as a surgeon in the merchant navy during World War II and is buried in Northern Ireland.

References 

1841 births
1899 deaths
Members of the House of Commons of Canada from Ontario
Conservative Party of Canada (1867–1942) MPs